Gamma Pictoris, Latinised from γ Pictoris, is a single, orange-hued star in the southern constellation of Pictor. It is a faintly visible to the naked eye with an apparent visual magnitude of 4.50. Based upon an annual parallax shift of 18.45 mas as seen from Earth, this star is located about 177 light-years from the Sun. It is moving away from the Sun with a radial velocity of +15.7 km/s.

This is an evolved K-type giant star with a stellar classification of K1 III. It has 1.59 times the mass of the Sun, while its diameter has been estimated as around 11 times that of the Sun.

References

K-type giants
Pictor (constellation)
Pictoris, Gamma
Durchmusterung objects
039523
027530
2042